The Station Diary consists of a set of records maintained at an Indian or Singaporean police station that contain information of importance to the running of the police station. It also serves as an introductory guide to newly appointed sub-inspectors or inspectors, who assume command of the station.

The station diary primarily contains the following set of information:

A map of the jurisdictional area, and important details such as educational institutions, water tanks, water bodies, banks and places of worship.
A list of known depredators (KDs), or criminals, in the area, along with other believed anti-social elements, including prostitutes and gamblers.
A list of people who could identify the KDs if the need arose, together with a list of known criminal associates, especially people who deal in buying stolen goods.
A document describing the modus operandi of already prosecuted criminals and habitual offenders.
Serious unsolved crimes in the jurisdictional area.
Serious unsolved crimes in adjoining police areas.

This system is in use with the Indian Police Forces and the Singapore Police Force.

Law enforcement in India
Law enforcement in Singapore